K-219 was a Project 667A Navaga-class ballistic missile submarine (NATO reporting name Yankee I) of the Soviet Navy. It carried 16 R-27U liquid-fuel missiles powered by UDMH with nitrogen tetroxide (NTO), and equipped with either 32 or 48 nuclear warheads.
K-219 was involved in what has become one of the most controversial submarine incidents during the Cold War on Friday 3 October 1986. While underway a submerged seal in a missile hatch cover failed, allowing high-pressure seawater to enter the missile tube and owing to the pressure differential rupture the missile fuel tanks, allowing missile's liquid fuel to mix and ultimately combust. Though there was no official announcement, the Soviet Union claimed the leak was caused by a collision with the submarine .
Although Augusta was operating within the area, both the United States Navy and the commander of K-219, Captain Second Rank Igor Britanov, deny that a collision took place.

The incident was novelized in the book Hostile Waters, which reconstructed the incident from descriptions by the survivors, ships' logs, the official investigations, and participants both ashore and afloat from the Soviet and the American sides.

Explosion

Shortly after 0530 Moscow time, seawater leaking into silo six of K-219 reacted with missile fuel, producing chlorine and nitrogen dioxide gases and sufficient heat to explosively decompose additional fuming nitric acid to produce more nitrogen dioxide gas. K-219 weapons officer Alexander Petrachkov attempted to deal with this by disengaging the hatch cover and venting the missile tube to the sea. Shortly after 0532, an explosion occurred in the silo. K-219 had previously experienced a similar event; one of her missile tubes was already disabled and welded shut, having been permanently sealed after an explosion caused by reaction between seawater leaking into the silo and missile fuel residue.

An article in Undersea warfare by Captain First Rank, Igor Kurdin, Russian Navy – K-219s previous XO (executive officer) – and Lieutenant Commander Wayne Grasdock, USN described the explosion occurrence as follows:

Two sailors were killed outright in the explosion, and a third died soon afterward from toxic gas poisoning. Sealing all of the compartments and full engagement of the sea water pumps in the stricken compartments enabled the depth to be stabilised.

Up to 25 sailors were trapped in a sealed section, and it was only after a conference with his incident specialists that the Captain allowed the Chief Engineer to open the hatch and save the 25 lives. It could be seen from instruments that although the nuclear reactor should have automatically been shut down, it was not. Lt. Nikolai Belikov, one of the reactor control officers, entered the reactor compartment but ran out of oxygen after turning just one of the four rod assemblies on the first reactor.  Twenty-year-old enlisted seaman Sergei Preminin then volunteered to shut down the reactor by following the instructions of the Chief Engineer. Working with a full-face gas mask, he successfully shut down the reactor. A large fire had developed within the compartment, raising the pressure. When Preminin tried to reach his comrades on the other side of a door, the pressure difference prevented him from opening it, and he died of asphyxiation in the reactor compartment.For his actions, Sergei Preminin was posthumously awarded the title Hero of the Russian Federation.

In a nuclear safe condition, and with sufficient stability to allow it to surface, Captain Britanov surfaced K-219 on battery power alone. Although a towline was attached, towing attempts were unsuccessful, and after subsequent poison gas leaks into the final aft compartments and against orders, Britanov ordered the crew to evacuate onto the towing ship, but remained aboard K-219 himself.

Displeased with Britanov's inability to repair his submarine and continue his patrol, Moscow ordered Valery Pshenichny, K-219 security officer, to assume command, transfer the surviving crew back to the submarine, and return to duty. Before those orders could be carried out the flooding reached a point beyond recovery and on 6 October 1986 the K-219 sank to the bottom of the Hatteras Abyssal Plain at a depth of about 6,000 m (18,000 ft).  Britanov abandoned ship shortly before the sinking.  K-219 full complement of nuclear weapons was lost along with the vessel.

Aftermath 
Preminin was posthumously awarded the Order of the Red Star for his bravery in securing the reactors. Britanov was charged with negligence, sabotage, and treason. He was never imprisoned, but waited for his trial in Sverdlovsk. On 30 May 1987, Defense Minister Sergey Sokolov was dismissed as a result of the Mathias Rust incident two days earlier, and replaced by Dmitry Yazov; the charges against Britanov were subsequently dismissed.

In popular culture
In 1997, the British BBC television film Hostile Waters, co-produced with HBO and starring Rutger Hauer, Martin Sheen, and Max von Sydow, was released in the United States by Warner Bros. It was based on the book by the same name, which claimed to describe the loss of K-219. In 2001, Captain Britanov filed suit, claiming Warner Bros. did not seek or get his permission to use his story or his character, and that the film did not portray the events accurately and made him look incompetent. After three years of hearing, the court ruled in Britanov's favor. Russian media reported that the filmmaker paid a settlement totaling under $100,000.

After the release of the movie, the U.S. Navy issued the following statement regarding both the book and the movie:

An article on the U.S. Navy's website posted by Captain 1st Rank (Ret.) Igor Kurdin (former XO of K-219) and Lieutenant Commander Wayne Grasdock denied any collision between K-219 and Augusta. Captain Britanov also denies a collision, and he has stated that he was not asked to be a guest speaker at Russian functions, because he refuses to follow the Russian government's interpretation of the K-219 incident.

In a BBC interview recorded in February 2013, Admiral of the Fleet Vladimir Chernavin, the Commander-in-Chief of the Soviet Navy at the time of the K-219 incident, says the accident was caused by a malfunction in a missile tube, and makes no mention of a collision with an American submarine.  The interview was conducted for the BBC2 series The Silent War.

See also

 List of sunken nuclear submarines

Notes

References

 Книга памяти – К-219 
 
 
  .
 , .

Yankee-class submarines
Ships built in the Soviet Union
1971 ships
Cold War submarines of the Soviet Union

Lost submarines of the Soviet Union
Sunken nuclear submarines
Foreign relations of the Soviet Union
Soviet Union–United States relations
Nuclear accidents and incidents
Maritime incidents in 1986
Ships built by Sevmash